The Red Flag was a journal on political theory, published by the Chinese Communist Party. It was one of the "Two Newspapers and One Magazine"  during the 1960s and 1970s. The newspapers were People's Daily and Guangming Daily. People's Liberation Army Daily is also regarded as one of them.

History and profile
Red Flag was started during the Great Leap Forward era in 1958. The journal was the successor to another journal, Study (Chinese: Xuexi). The title of Red Flag was given by Mao Zedong. Chen Boda was the editor of the journal, which  served as a crucial media outlet during the Cultural Revolution. In 1966, Pol Pot formed a similar magazine with the same name in Cambodia in Khmer, Tung Krahom, modelled on Red Flag.

During the 1960s, Red Flag temporarily ended publication, but was restarted in 1968. The frequency of the journal was monthly between its start in 1958 and 1979. It was published bi-monthly from 1980 to 1988. 

Red Flag covered theoretical arguments supported by the party. It also published articles on the views of the party about the Communist parties in other countries. For instance, in March 1963 the speech of Palmiro Togliatti, leader of the Italian Communist Party, at the 10th Congress was discussed and evaluated in detail. 

In May 1988 Chinese officials announced that the journal would be closed. Finally, it ceased publication in June 1988, and was succeeded by Qiushi (Chinese: Seeking Truth).

References

External links

1958 establishments in China
1988 disestablishments in China
Bi-monthly magazines published in China
Chinese-language magazines
Communist magazines
Cultural Revolution
Defunct magazines published in China
Defunct political magazines
Magazines established in 1958
Magazines disestablished in 1988
Magazines published in Beijing
Monthly magazines published in China
Political magazines published in China
State media